The 2019 Junior Pan American Rhythmic Gymnastics Championships was held in Monterrey, Mexico, June 13–15, 2019.

Medal summary

References

2019 in gymnastics
Pan American Gymnastics Championships
International gymnastics competitions hosted by Mexico
2019 in Mexican sports
June 2019 sports events in Mexico